The 3rd season of Gwiazdy tańczą na lodzie, the Polish edition of Dancing on Ice, started on October 3, 2008, and ended on December 12, 2008. It was broadcast by TVP2. Justyna Steczkowska and Maciej Kurzajewski as the hosts, and the judges were: Dorota Rabczewska, Włodzimierz Szaranowicz, Tomasz Jacyków and Renata Aleksander.

Couples

Scores

Red numbers indicate the lowest score for each week.
Green numbers indicate the highest score for each week.
 indicates the couple eliminated that week.
 indicates the returning couple that finished in the bottom two (Skate Off).
 indicates the couple withdrew.
 indicates the winning couple.
 indicates the runner-up.

Episodes

Week 1
Individual judges scores in charts below (given in parentheses) are listed in this order from left to right: Włodzimierz Szaranowicz, Dorota Rabczewska, Tomasz Jacyków, Renata Aleksander.

Part 1
White Stars Opening: Kid Rock - "All Summer Long"

Part 2
White Stars Opening: 

Part 3: Skate Off

Skate OFF

Week 2: Polish/Europe Week 
Individual judges scores in charts below (given in parentheses) are listed in this order from left to right: Włodzimierz Szaranowicz, Dorota Rabczewska, Tomasz Jacyków, Renata Aleksander.

Part 1
White Stars Opening: Marek Torzewski - "Do przodu Polsko"

Part 2
White Stars Opening: Ludwig van Beethoven - "Ode an die Freude"

Part 3: Skate Off

Week 3: TV Series/Eurovision Week
Individual judges scores in charts below (given in parentheses) are listed in this order from left to right: Włodzimierz Szaranowicz, Dorota Rabczewska, Tomasz Jacyków, Renata Aleksander.

Part 1
White Stars Opening: The X-Files Intro

Part 2
White Stars Opening: "To nie ja!"—Edyta Górniak

Part 3: Skate Off
Opening: Justyna Steczkowska–"Sama"

Week 4: Hot Dances/Polish Music Festivals Week
Individual judges scores in charts below (given in parentheses) are listed in this order from left to right: Włodzimierz Szaranowicz, Dorota Rabczewska, Tomasz Jacyków, Renata Aleksander.

Part 1
White Stars Opening: 

Part 2
White Stars Opening: Trubadurzy - "Znamy się tylko z widzenia"

Part 3: Skate Off

Week 5: Polish Music Legend/Opera Music Week
Individual judges scores in charts below (given in parentheses) are listed in this order from left to right: Włodzimierz Szaranowicz, Dorota Rabczewska, Tomasz Jacyków, Renata Aleksander.

Part 1
White Stars Opening: 

Part 2
White Stars Opening: 

Part 3: Skate Off

Week 6: One Song Stars/Musical Week 
Individual judges scores in charts below (given in parentheses) are listed in this order from left to right: Włodzimierz Szaranowicz, Dorota Rabczewska, Tomasz Jacyków, Renata Aleksander.

Part 1
White Stars Opening: Sam Brown - "Stop!"

Part 2
White Stars Opening: ABBA - "Mamma Mia"

Part 3: Skate Off

Week 7: Rock/Best of Youth Week 
Individual judges scores in charts below (given in parentheses) are listed in this order from left to right: Włodzimierz Szaranowicz, Dorota Rabczewska, Tomasz Jacyków, Renata Aleksander.

Part 1
White Stars Opening: U2 - "I Still Haven't Found What I'm Looking For"

Part 2
White Stars Opening: Ich Troje - "Powiedz"

Part 3: Skate Off

Week 8: Movie/Hip Hop & R&B Week
Individual judges scores in charts below (given in parentheses) are listed in this order from left to right: Włodzimierz Szaranowicz, Dorota Rabczewska, Tomasz Jacyków, Renata Aleksander.

Part 1
White Stars Opening: Wojciech Kilar - Polonaise from "Pan Tadeusz"

Part 2
White Stars Opening: Bob Sinclar - "Rock This Party (Everybody Dance Now)"

Part 3: Skate Off
Opening: Justyna Steczkowska - "Dziewczyna Szamana"

Week 9: Polish Diva Song/Cartoon Week
Individual judges scores in charts below (given in parentheses) are listed in this order from left to right: Włodzimierz Szaranowicz, Dorota Rabczewska, Tomasz Jacyków, Renata Aleksander.

Part 1
Opening: Justyna Steczkowska - "To mój czas"

Part 2
White Stars Opening: "Reksio" Theme

Part 3: Skate Off
White Stars Opening: Urszula Dudziak - " Papaya"

Week 10: Classic/70's Week
Individual judges scores in charts below (given in parentheses) are listed in this order from left to right: Włodzimierz Szaranowicz, Dorota Rabczewska, Tomasz Jacyków, Renata Aleksander.

Part 1
Opening: Vadim Brodski

Part 2
White Stars Opening: 

Part 3: Skate Off
Opening: Justyna Steczkowska - "Kosmiczna rewolucja"

Week 11: Christmas/Best Week
Individual judges scores in charts below (given in parentheses) are listed in this order from left to right: Włodzimierz Szaranowicz, Dorota Rabczewska, Tomasz Jacyków, Renata Aleksander.

Part 1
Opening: Justyna Steczkowska - "Odnajdę cię"

Part 2
Opening: 

Part 3: Skate Off
Opening: 

3
2008 Polish television seasons